The Leeds municipal election was held on 8 May 1969, with one third of the councillors up for election. The Conservative incumbent in Armley had defected to Independent Conservative in the interim and hoped to defend it as such.

In contrast to their performance nationally, the Tories fell back upon their peak the previous year, with Labour managing to stabilise their support somewhat. The sole beneficiary (unlike last year, the Communists dropped back to their normal support) were the Liberals, who obtained their largest vote since 1963. In total three seats changed hands, with a spectacular gain in West Hunslet by the Liberals from the Conservatives, another loss of the latter's to Labour in Osmondthorpe, offset a little by a comfortable win back in Armley from their former incumbent.

Election result

The result had the following consequences for the total number of seats on the Council after the elections:

Ward results

References

Leeds
Leeds City Council elections
1960s in Leeds